The , abbreviated as Kōfuku, is a Japanese political party founded by Ryuho Okawa on 23 May 2009. The HRP is the political wing of the conservative Happy Science religious movement.

Okawa is the current president of the party.

Electoral history
In 2009, the party had 345 candidates, placing it on the ballots of 99% of Japan's 300 constituencies. Many perennial candidates such as Yoshiro Nakamatsu joined the HRP. Despite fielding a total of more than 1 million votes, the party did not win any seats in the election.

In 2012, the party again failed to gain any seats.

As of April 2018, the party had 21 elected local councilors.

Policies
According to its manifesto, the group's goal is to more than double Japan's population to 300 million through making child-rearing easier for mothers and accepting foreigners as workforce. It also aims to change the pacifist Article 9 of the Japanese Constitution in order to increase Japan's economic and military power.

The group identifies itself as "conservative" and is generally considered a right-wing party. The party advocates a nuclear deterrent for Japan, denies that the Nanking Massacre occurred and has called for China to be expelled from the United Nations Security Council. The party has formed links to the American right, having attended the Conservative Political Action Conference in 2012, and bringing with them members of the Tokyo Tea Party, supporting low tax.

In 2022, the party has expressed sympathy for Russias position following the Invasion of Ukraine, criticizing the Ukrainian President Volodymyr Zelenskyy.

Administration

Jay Aeba, also known as Jikido Aeba (饗庭直道, あえば直道, Aeba Jikido), was, of May 2012, advisor of the Republican National Committee of the United States in charge of Asia, with Yuki Oikawa as one of the  officials of HRP.

President

Leaders

Criticism
According to The Japan Times, "for many, the Happies smell suspiciously like a cult". The party has released promotional videos that claim North Korea and China are plotting to invade and colonize Japan after first subduing it through nuclear warfare.

References

External links
 
 
Various Manifesto of the Party 

2009 establishments in Japan
Anti-Chinese sentiment in Japan
Anti-Korean sentiment in Japan
Conservative parties in Japan
Nationalist parties in Japan
Nanjing Massacre deniers
Far-right politics in Japan
Political parties established in 2009
Political parties in Japan
Racism in Japan
Religious political parties
Religious organizations based in Japan
Japanese new religions